Marion L. Munley (August 19, 1905 – September 14, 1983) was one of the first women elected to the Pennsylvania House of Representatives. During her time, she established multiple precedents for women in Pennsylvania public life, and was a prominent leader in her community.

Life 
Marion L. Munley was born in Buffalo, New York, on August 19, 1905 to Martin and Julia Walsh Langan. A graduate of St. John's High School, Munley attended Marywood College (now Marywood University) and the Powell School of Business in Scranton, Pennsylvania. 
She married Democratic Pennsylvania Rep. Robert W. Munley. The couple had two sons, Robert W. and James M. Munley, who grew up to become a truck accident lawyer and a federal district court judge, respectively. Her father-in-law William J. Munley also served in the Pennsylvania General Assembly.

Political career 
Following her husband’s death on January 25, 1947, Munley took his place in the Pennsylvania House of Representatives, becoming the first woman to represent Lackawanna County in the state house. She went on to be re-elected an additional eight times.  During her tenure, she was the first woman elected to a leadership position in the Democratic Caucus in the 300-year history of the legislature. From 1965-1966, she also became Secretary of the House of Representatives, the first and only woman to hold that position. In 1987, she became the first woman to have her portrait hung in the Pennsylvania State Capitol.

In addition, Munley served on the Commission on Interstate Cooperation from 1961-1962. Munley also organized the 20th Ward Democratic Women’s Club and served as its president for five years.

Other political activities 
Munley was a member of the Young Democrats of Lackawanna County, the Blakely Democratic Club, the Jermyn Democratic Club, and the Women’s Democratic Club of Mayfield. She was instrumental in the development of industry in Lackawanna County, and in the process of developing the Archbald Glacial Pothole area into a state park. She was also a determined proponent of labor legislation and equal pay for women in Pennsylvania.

Death 
Munley died on September 14, 1983 in her home of 50 years in Archbald, Pennsylvania. The Honorable Marion L. Munley Endowed Scholarship, established at Marywood University by Munley's family in her honor, is presented to a student interested in law and/or public service.

References

Women state legislators in Pennsylvania
Democratic Party members of the Pennsylvania House of Representatives
1905 births
1983 deaths
People from Lackawanna County, Pennsylvania
Politicians from Buffalo, New York
Marywood University alumni
20th-century American politicians
20th-century American women politicians